A spin-off in television is a new series containing characters or settings that originated in a previous series, but with a different focus, tone, or theme. For example, the series Frasier was a spin-off of the earlier series Cheers: the character Frasier Crane was introduced as a secondary character on Cheers, and became the protagonist of his own series, set in a different city, in the spin-off. Spin-offs are particularly common in sitcom. A related phenomenon, not to be confused with the spin-off, is the crossover.

Some spin-offs are "engineered" to introduce a new character on the original television series, just so that that character can anchor the new spin-off – that episode of the original series is often known as a "backdoor pilot". For example, the character Avery Ryan appeared in two episodes of the Las Vegas-based CSI: Crime Scene Investigation before the premiere of CSI: Cyber.

A revival, a later remake of a preexisting show, is not a spin-off. An exception can be made to series such as The Transformers where the lines of continuity are blurred. If a television pilot was written but never shot, it is not considered a spin-off. When a show undergoes a name change, it is not necessarily a spin-off.

Neither is a reboot series, a term recently invented for motion pictures, which can also occur in television (e.g. The Battlestar Galactica series of 2003 is a reboot, not a spin-off of the 1978 version). This is distinct from a revival in that there is little or no attempt to retain continuity, or casting, with the original. A recent example is the 1987 series Beauty and the Beast, rebooted as the 2012 CW television series Beauty & the Beast, which keeps only the main premise of a female law enforcement official aided by a man-beast, the New York City locale, and the names of the two main characters. The CW's Beauty and the Beast was later rebooted again as a HBO Max series starting in 2023.

Alphabetical list by parent series


#

A

B

C

D

E

F

G

H

I

J

K

L

M

N

O

P

Q

R

S

T

U

V

W

X

Y

Z

See also
 List of American television series based on British television series
 Television shows that spun off from anthology series
 List of animated spin-offs from prime time shows

References

External links
The 10 Best TV Spin-offs of All Time
15 Worst TV Spin-offs Ever
Top 10 Worst TV Spin-Offs - TIME

Spin-offs
T